Helga Frier (12 June 1893 – 9 January 1972) was a Danish actress.

She debuted in 1914 in the Den jyske Folkescene.

Filmography

Odds 777 - 1932
De blaa drenge - 1933
Rasmines bryllup - 1935
Sjette trækning - 1936
Champagnegaloppen - 1938
En pige med pep - 1940
Barnet - 1940
I de gode gamle dage - 1940
En ganske almindelig pige - 1940
Gå med mig hjem - 1941
Wienerbarnet - 1941
Alle mand på dæk - 1942
Når bønder elsker - 1942
Møllen - 1943
Ungdommens rus - 1943
De tre skolekammerater - 1944
Biskoppen - 1944
Mordets melodi - 1944
Teatertosset - 1944
Frihed, lighed og Louise - 1944
Jeg elsker en anden - 1946
Hans store aften - 1946
Det gælder os alle - 1949
Lejlighed til leje - 1949
Min kone er uskyldig - 1950
Mosekongen - 1950
Frihed forpligter - 1951
Fra den gamle købmandsgård - 1951
Fodboldpræsten - 1951
Husmandstøsen - 1952
Det store løb - 1952
Fløjtespilleren - 1953
Min søn Peter - 1953
Flintesønnerne - 1956
Den kloge mand (1956) - 1956
Sønnen fra Amerika - 1957
Vagabonderne på Bakkegården - 1958
Poeten og Lillemor - 1959
Det skete på Møllegården - 1960
Den rige enke - 1962
Kampen om Næsbygaard - 1964
Næsbygaards arving - 1965
Krybskytterne på Næsbygaard - 1966

References

External links
 

Danish film actresses
People from Aarhus
1893 births
1972 deaths